Leo Nowak (born 17 March 1929) was the first bishop of the newly re-erected Roman Catholic Diocese of Magdeburg, Germany, from 1994 until 2001. He was born in Magdeburg.

Career
Nowak was ordained a priest on 10 May 1956 for the Diocese Paderborn. On 12 February 1990 he was appointed Apostolic Administrator of Magdeburg and the Titular Bishop of Cissa. He was created bishop on 24 March 1990. The main consecrator was Johannes Braun, his predecessor as Apostolic Administrator of Magdeburg, and co-consecrators were Johannes Joachim Degenhardt and Theodor Hubrich. On 27 June 1994 he was appointed bishop of Magdeburg and installed on 9 October 1994. Following canon law, Nowak offered his resignation to the pope in 2004, upon reaching the age of 75. He retired as bishop of Magdeburg on 17 March 2004. He was succeeded by Gerhard Feige.

Awards 
 Order of Merit of the Federal Republic of Germany
 Order of Merit of Saxony-Anhalt

External links 
Catholic Hierarchy bio

1929 births
Living people
Roman Catholic bishops of Magdeburg
20th-century German Roman Catholic bishops
Commanders Crosses of the Order of Merit of the Federal Republic of Germany
20th-century German Roman Catholic priests